Hakuzōsu (白蔵主), also written Hakuzosu and Hakuzousu, is the name of a popular kitsune character who pretended to be a priest in Japanese folklore.

Legend
The Buddhist monk Hakuzōsu lived in Osaka at the temple Shōrin-ji.

He was a believer in Inari Ōkami sama and kept a few kitsunes in his temple.

He used these kitsunes to foretell the future.

Plays
The legend of Hakuzōsu became a Kyōgen play, Tsurigitsune (‘Fox Trapping’) / Konkai (‘The Cry of the Fox’)

In this story, a hunter is visited by his uncle, the priest Hakuzōsu, who lectures his nephew on the evils of killing foxes. The hunter is nearly convinced, but after the priest departs, he hears the cry of the fox and realizes it wasn't his uncle at all but a fox in guise. The fox resumes his natural form and reverts to his wild ways, takes the bait in a trap and is captured.

References
 
 

Buddhist folklore
Kitsune (fox)
Literature featuring anthropomorphic foxes
Japanese folklore
Shapeshifting